Villiers-le-Bel is a commune in the French department of Val-d'Oise, in the northern suburbs of Paris.

History

A tragedy occurred in the town in the early evening of March 25, 1818, when a cracked 6,000 pound (2721 kg) bell being removed from a belfry came crashing down, killing approximately 25 onlookers.  Workers who remained hanging from collapsed steeple were able to be rescued.

In the 1950s the commune had about 5,000 residents but it urbanized from 1950 to 1974. As of 2007 the commune had 26,000 people.

In 2007 the mayor at the time, François Pupponi, stated that the city became a "social ghetto" suffered from planning errors made in the 1950s, as the community did not gain the businesses necessary to support the population. Jean-Louis Marsac, the first deputy mayor, stated that the commune grew without gaining the proper infrastructure.

2007 riots

On the night of 25 November 2007, gangs attacked a police station in Villiers-le-Bel, torched cars, and vandalized stores. The violence was prompted by the deaths of two adolescents after a crash between their motorbike and a police patrol car at an intersection. The disturbances spread to neighbouring towns on the night of 26 November. 82 police officers were injured, four of them seriously, by shotgun blasts.

Transport
The Paris Métro, RER, serves through the Villiers-le-Bel - Gonesse - Arnouville station on Paris RER line D. However, this station is located in the neighboring commune of Arnouville-lès-Gonesse,  from the town center of Villiers-le-Bel.

Population

 47% of the commune's population was under the age of 30.

Economy
 Charles de Gaulle International Airport is the primary employer of the area. Within Villiers-le-Bel itself the largest employers were the Charles-Richet Hospital, the Flopak conditioning company, Gilson medical material company, and public services.

Education
The commune has 30 educational institutions, including 11 preschools and 11 elementary schools along with four junior high schools and a vocational high school.  the commune does not have its own general high school/sixth-form college.
 Junior high schools include Collège Léon Blum, Collège Martin Luther King, and Collège Saint Exupéry along with the private Collège privé Saint Didier
 Lycée Mendès France (vocational high school) is in the commune
Two nearby senior high schools are in Sarcelles, Lycée la tourelle and Lycée Jean Jacques Rousseau. Students attending general high school studies go to J. J. Rousseau.

Area universities:
Université de Cergy-Pontoise
University of Paris 8
University of Paris 13

Neighboring communes
 Arnouville-lès-Gonesse
 Bouqueval
 Écouen
 Le Plessis-Gassot
 Gonesse
 Sarcelles

Personalities
 Alexandre Beljame (1842–1906), writer.
 Mickael Citony footballer
 Marie-Laure Delie footballer
 Gaël N’Lundulu footballer
 Yoann Salmier, footballer
 Kevin Vinetot footballer
 Lino rapper 
 Mike Maignan footballer

See also
Communes of the Val-d'Oise department

References

External links

 

Association of Mayors of the Val d'Oise 

Communes of Val-d'Oise